Raymond Court (born December 2, 1932, Lausanne) is a Swiss jazz trumpeter.

Court began playing trumpet late in his teens and by age 20 was playing in Raymond Droz's band (1952-1956). He played later in the 1950s with Flavio Ambrosetti and Kurt Weil, and in the early 1960s with Daniel Humair, Martial Solal, and Rene Urtreger. Starting in the mid-1960s, he began concentrating on a new career in woodworking and cabinetry, but returned to music after about a decade, recording as a leader in the 1980s and with Weil again and Charly Antolini in the 1990s.

References
Peter Schwalm, "Raymond Court". The New Grove Dictionary of Jazz, 2nd edition, ed. Barry Kernfeld.

Swiss jazz trumpeters